Francis Reid Long (May 19, 1812 – June 22, 1881) was Kansas City Mayor in 1869 and founder of what would become Commerce Bancshares.

Biography
Long was born in Woodford County, Kentucky

After moving to Kansas City he joined with Nathaniel Grant and A.S. Branham to found the Long, Grant & Company which in turn would become the Kansas City Savings Association.

During Long's term the Hannibal Bridge—the first bridge to cross the Missouri River—opened.  The bridge would establish Kansas City as the dominant city in the region.  With the bridge came the founding of the Kansas City Stockyards.

References

1812 births
1881 deaths
People from Woodford County, Kentucky
Mayors of Kansas City, Missouri
Burials at Elmwood Cemetery (Kansas City, Missouri)
19th-century American politicians